Robert Munro, 1st Baron Alness,  (28 May 1868 – 6 October 1955), was a Scottish lawyer, judge and Liberal politician. He served as Secretary for Scotland between 1916 and 1922 in David Lloyd George's coalition government and as Lord Justice Clerk between 1922 and 1933.

Background and education
Munro was born in Alness, Ross-shire, the son of Margaret (née Sinclair), daughter of Reverend John Sinclair, and Reverend Alexender Ross Munro. He was educated at Aberdeen Grammar School and the University of Edinburgh.

Legal and political career

Munro was admitted to the Scottish Bar as an Advocate in 1893. He was a Counsel to the Board of Inland Revenue and became a King's Counsel in 1910. At this point he lived at 15 Heriot Row: a huge Georgian townhouse in the centre of Edinburgh.

In the January 1910 general election he was elected as a Liberal Member of Parliament for Wick Burghs, holding the seat until its abolition for the 1918 election. He was then returned to the House of Commons as MP for the new Roxburgh and Selkirk constituency, holding the seat until 1922.

In 1913 Munro was sworn of the Privy Council and appointed Lord Advocate by H. H. Asquith. When David Lloyd George became Prime Minister in December 1916, Munro entered the cabinet as Secretary for Scotland, a post he held until the end of the coalition government in October 1922. The latter year he was appointed to the bench as Lord Justice Clerk and President of Second Division of the Court of Session, taking the judicial title Lord Alness. He also held the office of Honourable Bencher, Lincoln's Inn in 1924.

Following his retirement from the bench in 1933, he was raised to the peerage as Baron Alness, of Alness in the County of Ross and Cromarty, on 27 June 1934. He returned to political office in May 1940 when Winston Churchill appointed him a Lord-in-waiting (government whip) in the newly formed war coalition, sitting as a Liberal National. He retained this post (as one of few non-Conservatives) in Churchill's brief 1945 caretaker government. In 1947 he was invested as a Knight Grand Cross of the Order of the British Empire.

Lord Alness was also a Deputy Lieutenant of Edinburgh.

Famous Cases

Donald Merrett murder - not proven (on direction of Lord Alness)

Personal life
Lord Alness was twice married. He married firstly Edith Gwladys Evans, daughter of the Reverend John Llewellyn Evans, in 1898. After her death in September 1920 he married secondly Olga Marie Grumler, daughter of Jeanes Georges Grumler, in October 1921. Both marriages were childless. Lord Alness died in October 1955, aged 87, when the barony became extinct.

References

 Torrance, David, The Scottish Secretaries (Birlinn 2006)

External links 

1868 births
1955 deaths
Alumni of the University of Edinburgh
Barons in the Peerage of the United Kingdom
Knights Grand Cross of the Order of the British Empire
Lord Advocates
Members of the Judicial Committee of the Privy Council
Members of the Parliament of the United Kingdom for Highland constituencies
Members of the Privy Council of the United Kingdom
Ministers in the Churchill wartime government, 1940–1945
Barons created by George V
Scottish Liberal Party MPs
Senators of the College of Justice
UK MPs 1910
UK MPs 1910–1918
UK MPs 1918–1922
UK MPs who were granted peerages
Ministers in the Churchill caretaker government, 1945